Symphytum caucasicum, the beinwell, blue comfrey, or Caucasian comfrey, is an ornamental plant of genus Symphytum in the family Boraginaceae, which is native to the Caucasus.

References

External links
  Symphytum caucasicum

caucasicum